Yantanglestes is a genus of small, Chinese mesonychid with slender jaws that first appeared during the Early Paleocene in the Thanetian stage. It was found throughout Asia. It is the oldest known mesonychid. Yantanglestes became extinct during the Nongshanian division of the Late Paleocene, and lived sympatrically with its descendant genera, including Dissacus, Sinonyx and Jiangxia.

References

External links
Science

Mesonychids
Paleocene mammals
Thanetian life
Paleocene mammals of Asia
Paleogene China
Prehistoric animals of China
Fossil taxa described in 1980
Prehistoric placental genera